XI may refer to:

 11 (number), XI in Roman numerals
 First XI of a cricket or football team
 XI monogram, an early Christian symbol
 XI (album), an album by Metal Church
 X.I., a fictional supercomputer in the video game Terminal Velocity
 Northern Ireland, ISO 3166-1 alpha-2 country code used for tax purposes

See also
 Xi (disambiguation)
 11 (disambiguation)